The 2013–14 William & Mary Tribe men's basketball team represented the College of William & Mary during the 2013–14 NCAA Division I men's basketball season. The Tribe, led by 11th year head coach Tony Shaver, played their home games at Kaplan Arena and were members of the Colonial Athletic Association. With his 11th season, Shaver became the longest-tenured coach in program history.

The team finished the season 20–12, 10–6 in CAA play and lost in the championship game of the 2014 CAA men's basketball tournament to Delaware, 74–75. The one-point margin is the closest that William & Mary has come to qualifying for the NCAA Division I men's basketball tournament; the Tribe lost all seven of its previous tournament bid-clinching games including three prior CAA championship games (1983, 2008, and 2010). Despite the team's final record, William & Mary elected not to participate in a postseason tournament, which would have been its first postseason bid since 2010.

Preseason
On October 22, 2013, William & Mary was picked to finish fifth, out of nine teams, in the Colonial Athletic Association's pre-season coaches poll. Junior guard Marcus Thornton was picked to the first all-conference team while senior forward Tim Rusthoven was selected to the second all-conference team.

Roster
Source

Schedule and results
Source

|-
!colspan=9 style="background:#006400; color:#FFD700;"| Non-conference schedule

|-
!colspan=9 style="background:#006400; color:#FFD700;"| Conference schedule

|-
!colspan=9 style="background:#006400; color:#FFD700;"| 2014 CAA Tournament

Postseason
Three William & Mary players received CAA end-of-season accolades. Junior guard Marcus Thornton was named to the first all-conference team, the first Tribe player to receive this distinction since Adam Hess in 2004. He was named to the National Association of Basketball Coaches (NABC) All-District 10 First Team for the second time, tying him for the most NABC First Team selections in program history. CollegeInsider.com named Thornton their CAA Most Valuable Player (which is not technically the same thing as the player of the year, according to CollegeInsider.com). Thornton's 599 points on the season ranked fifth all-time in school history and the most by a player for the Tribe since 1959–60.

Other accolades went to senior forward Tim Rusthoven, who was selected to the all-conference second team, and freshman Omar Prewitt, who was named the CAA Rookie of the Year, becoming only the second William & Mary men's player to receive this honor.

References

William and Mary Tribe
William & Mary Tribe men's basketball seasons
William and Mary Tribe
William and Mary Tribe